False Trail ("The Hunters 2"), is a Swedish thriller film which was released to cinemas in Sweden on 2 September 2011, directed by Kjell Sundvall with Rolf Lassgård and Peter Stormare in the main roles. The film is the sequel to the 1996 film The Hunters, it sneak-premiered on 17 August 2011 in Överkalix and in Norrland on 2 September 2011 and had its main all over Sweden premiere on 9 September 2011.

Unlike the first film, where the title pointed to the villainous hunters, the title of the sequel hints towards the feud between Erik and Torsten, both with their own predatory nature.

Premise
15 years after the events of the first film, Erik (Rolf Lassgård) is forced to return to the Norrland village he had left following the events of the first film, after a brutal crime is committed.

Production
The film's director started filming in August 2010 on location in Överkalix and Kalix in the upper-north part of Sweden.

References

External links 
 
 
 
 
Blog from location
Jägarna 2 at Bio.Nu

2011 films
Films directed by Kjell Sundvall
2010s Swedish-language films
Swedish thriller films
Films set in Norrbotten
2011 thriller films
Swedish sequel films
2010s Swedish films